The 1st Frigate Squadron was an naval unit of the Royal Navy from 1972 to 2001.

Operational history
During its existence, the squadron included Leander-class and Type 22 frigates. Ships from the squadron participated in the Cod Wars, the Silver Jubilee Fleet Review, the Armilla Patrol and the Falklands War. The squadron was disbanded in 2001.

1977
At the Silver Jubilee Fleet Review, 24–29 June 1977, 1st Frigate Squadron comprised:
 HMS Galatea (F18) – Capt. D. B. Nolan, RN (Captain 1st Frigate Squadron)
  – Capt. H. M. Balfour, RN
  – Cdr. R. B. Mortlock, RN
  – Cdr. M. A. C. Moore, RN
  – Cdr. D. H. Barraclough, RN
  – Cdr. J. T. Saunders, RN

Squadron commander

References

See also
 List of squadrons and flotillas of the Royal Navy

Frigate squadrons of the Royal Navy